Nils Bosson Sture (1426–1494) was a Swedish noble and supporter of Sten Sture to be King of Sweden. He is famous for his flanking movement to surprise King Christian I of Denmark's army at the Battle of Brunkeberg in 1471. He died as a politician in the Swedish government in Stockholm, a proud man.

Support of Sture 

Sten Sture was elected as King Charles VIII of Sweden's successor, which was considered rebellion to Christian I of Denmark's legitimate rulership of Sweden. However, Nils Sture was a supporter of Charles VIII, and respected Sten Sture. Nils Sture was also a relative of Sten Sture as his cousin, and his support for Sten was proven family support. Christian I declared war on Sweden, and mobilized his armies. Nils joined Sten's armies in preparation to defend Sweden.

Military career 

Nils Sture traveled to central Sweden to recruit more Peasant Militia and Provincial Knights as Sten was doing. When he had recruited enough men, he joined Knut Posse and Sten near Stockholm. Posse was to attack from Stockholm to the east of the Danish Army. Sten was to launch the juggernaut at the Danish front, and Nils was to attack using a flanking movement. All of the Swedes were in position, and when the time came, the battle unfolded. Nils inched around the Danish Army, but Sten was having trouble. Nils had to hurry to save the Swedish Army. His attack nailed Christian's Army, and the Danish Army was smashed. The three Swedish Generals won against the Danish, but Posse was mortally wounded and died in Stockholm. Nils switched to politics after the war, and his death was at peace.

References 

1426 births
1494 deaths
Swedish generals
15th-century Swedish people